= Katuli =

Katuli is one of the most important tunes in Mazandarani music. It is a part of vocal music. Literally it means "high", "height", "big" and also "long" in Tabari. Its form is tripartite. The first part is in free meter and the third part is totally metric. The second part stands metrically in between.
